Brachylagus is a genus of lagomorph that contains the smallest living leporid, the pygmy rabbit. One extinct species, Brachylagus coloradoensis, is also known.

References

Mammal genera
Mammal genera with one living species
Leporidae